The 2nd United States Sharpshooters was a sharpshooter regiment that served in the Union Army during the American Civil War. From 1861 to January 1863 they were members of the "First Iron Brigade" also known as the "Iron Brigade of the East".

Service
The 2nd U.S. Sharpshooters was raised as follows: 
Company "A" in Minnesota on October 5, 1861. 
Company "B" in Michigan on October 4, 1861.
Company "C" in Pennsylvania on October 4, 1861
Company "D" in Maine on November 2, 1861.
Company "E" in Vermont on November 9, 1861.
Company "F" in New Hampshire on November 28, 1861.
Company "G" in New Hampshire on December 10, 1861.
Company "H" in Vermont on December 31, 1861.

The 2nd and the 1st United States Volunteer Sharpshooter Regiment were consolidated on December 31, 1864, and the regiment was broken up on February 20, 1865, and the remaining companies distributed as follows:
Company "A" transferred to the  1st Minnesota Volunteer Infantry Regiment.
Company "B" transferred to the  5th Michigan Volunteer Infantry Regiment.
Company "C" transferred to the  105th Pennsylvania Volunteer Infantry Regiment.
Company "D" transferred to the  17th Maine Volunteer Infantry Regiment.
Company "F" transferred to the  5th New Hampshire Volunteer Infantry.
Company "G" transferred to the  5th New Hampshire Volunteer Infantry.
Company "H" transferred to the  4th Vermont Volunteer Infantry Regiment.

Total strength and casualties
The regiment suffered 8 officers and 117 enlisted men who were killed in action or mortally wounded and 2 officers and 123 enlisted men who died of disease, for a total of 250 fatalities.

Commanders
Colonel Hiram Berdan in 1861
Colonel Henry A.V. Post from January 1, 1862, to November 16, 1862
Colonel Hiram Berdan from November 16, 1862, until 1864
Colonel Homer R. Stoughton Jan 19, 1864.

See also

List of United States Volunteer Civil War Units
1st United States Volunteer Sharpshooter Regiment
Western Sharpshooters Regiment
1st Regiment Michigan Volunteer Sharpshooters
1st Pennsylvania Rifles, aka the 13th Pennsylvania Reserve Regiment
1st Company Massachusetts Sharpshooters
2nd Company Massachusetts Sharpshooters

Notes

References
The Civil War Archive
Reenactors, Company C, 2nd United States Volunteer Sharpshooter Regiment
Reenactors, Company D, 2nd United States Volunteer Sharpshooter Regiment

United States Volunteer Civil War units and formations
Eastern Iron Brigade
Sharpshooter units and formations of the American Civil War
1861 establishments in the United States
Military units and formations established in 1861
Military units and formations disestablished in 1864